J35 may refer to:

Vehicles

Aircraft
 Beechcraft J35 Bonanza, an American civil utility aircraft
 Saab J 35 Draken, a Swedish fighter
 Shenyang J-35, a Chinese fighter

Locomotives
 LNER Class J35, a British steam locomotive class

Ships and boats
 J/35, a keelboat
 , a Fundy-class minesweeper of the Royal Canadian Navy

Other uses 
 Allison J35, an American turbojet engine
 Elongated triangular orthobicupola, a Johnson solid (J35)
 Honda J35, a car engine
 Johor State Route J35, in Malaysia
 Tahlequah (orca), a killer whale
 Tonsillitis